Pablo Solares-Rowbury (born December 22, 1984 in San Luis Potosí, Mexico) is a Mexican middle-distance runner. He holds the Mexican national records for the 800 meters, 1500 meters and indoor mile. Solares represented Mexico in the 1500m at the 2008 IAAF World Indoor Championships in Athletics in Valencia and the 800m at the 2009 IAAF World Championship in Athletics in Berlin.

Personal life
In 2008, Solares graduated from Rice University majoring in Economics and in 2010 he earned a master's degree in Finance from ITESM Campus Monterrey. He is currently a Managing Director at IGC Holdings. Solares has been married to Shannon Rowbury since April 2015.

Personal Bests

Achievements

References

External links

Tilastopaja biography

Mexican male middle-distance runners
1984 births
Living people
Rice University alumni
Monterrey Institute of Technology and Higher Education alumni
Sportspeople from San Luis Potosí
Central American and Caribbean Games bronze medalists for Mexico
Competitors at the 2010 Central American and Caribbean Games
Central American and Caribbean Games medalists in athletics
Competitors at the 2007 Summer Universiade
Competitors at the 2009 Summer Universiade